Taisho may refer to:
 Emperor Taishō of Japan (1879–1926), reigned 1912–1926. His given name was Yoshihito.
 Taishō era (大正時代), a period in the history of Japan
 Taishō-ku, Osaka, a ward in the city of Osaka, Japan
 Taisho (solar term) (大暑), solar term in East Asia.
 Taisho Tripitaka the Taishō Shinshū Daizōkyō (大正新脩大藏經), a standardized and commonly cited version of the Chinese Buddhist canon (Tripitaka) compiled in Japan during the Taishō era.
 Taisho Pharmaceutical, a pharmaceutical company
 The Japanese word for the Military Rank of General (大将). Originally derived from Sei-i Taishōgun (征夷大将軍, "Commander-in-Chief of the Expeditionary Force Against the Barbarians").